The Stu Sells 1824 Halifax Classic is an annual bonspiel on the men's World Curling Tour. It is held annually in November at the Halifax Curling Club in Halifax, Nova Scotia (the club was founded in 1824). It has been held since 2018. The event is part of the "Stu Sells Series" of curling events (along with the Stu Sells Oakville Tankard, and the Stu Sells Toronto Tankard), sponsored by the Stu Sells Realty Team.

Team Glenn Howard won both the 2018 and 2019 events. Glenn Howard himself was away coaching the Scottish women's team at the 2018 European Curling Championships, so his son, Scott skipped the team to the inaugural championship in 2018.

Team Brad Gushue won the 2020 event, which only consisted of teams from Atlantic Canada due to travel restrictions imposed by the COVID-19 pandemic. These same restrictions prevented Team Gushue's lead Geoff Walker from playing in the event, and he was replaced by Ryan McNeil Lamswood.

A women's event was added in 2021.

Past champions

Men

Women

References

Curling competitions in Halifax, Nova Scotia
2018 establishments in Nova Scotia